Zhang Lianwei (born 2 May 1965) is a Chinese professional golfer.

Zhang was the first golfer from the People's Republic of China to achieve substantial success on the international professional circuit. In January 2003 he became the first Chinese golfer to win on the European Tour, and the following year was the first to compete in the Masters Tournament, one of the four major championships.

Career
Zhang was born in Zhuhai in Guangdong Province. The People's Republic of China's first golf course opened in 1984, and Zhang took up the game soon afterwards. He worked as a caddie and won the China Amateur Open Championship three times before turning professional in 1994.

Early in his career, Zhang won a number of smaller tournaments around Asia, in China, Malaysia and Thailand. He has competed predominantly on the Asian Tour since 1997, but has also played extensively on the Japan Golf Tour. He has also played outside Asia with limited success. However he did win a tournament in Canada in 2000.

Zhang came to global attention at the 2003 Caltex Singapore Masters, where he edged out Ernie Els with a birdie on the final hole to become the first Chinese golfer to win on the European Tour. With this victory he also became the first Chinese golfer to make the top 100 in the Official World Golf Rankings. As a result, in 2004 he received a special invitation to play in the Masters Tournament, becoming the first player from mainland China to compete in the tournament. His invite drew significant criticism, with many players believing that there were other Asian golfers more deserving of a place in the Augusta field.

Zhang has won a total of five tournaments on the Asian Tour, and has a best end of season ranking of 2nd on the Order of Merit, achieved in 2003. He has also won six times on the China Tour, where he topped the Order of Merit in 2006.

In 2009, while being invited to compete in the Omega European Masters in Crans-sur-Sierre Switzerland, Zhang met Stéphane Barras the local club pro, who later became his coach. In February 2010 Zhang and Stéphane opened a golf training center in Haigeng, Kunming in the province of Yunnan, (the Olympic training ground of China). In April 2010, Zhang regained his title at the PGA of China and in 2011 he finishing -13 and best Chinese at the China Open co-sanctioned with European Tour, OneAsia tour and Asian Tour.

In 2014, Zhang hit the very first tee shot in the history of the newly established PGA Tour China. In 2015 he was a rookie on the European Senior Tour. In 2016,  he won his first senior title, the SSE Enterprise Wales Senior Open.

Amateur wins
1989 China Amateur Open Championship
1991 China Amateur Open Championship
1994 China Amateur Open Championship

Professional wins (20)

European Tour wins (1)

1Co-sanctioned by the Asian Tour

Asian Tour wins (5)

1Co-sanctioned by the European Tour

Asian Tour playoff record (1–0)

Canadian Tour wins (1)

Omega China Tour wins (8)
1995 (1) Volvo Open
1996 (1) Blue Ribbon Open
1997 (1) Hugo Boss Open
2006 (2) Omega China Tour – Zhuhai, Omega China Tour – Shanghai
2007 (2) Omega China Tour – Qingdao, Omega China Tour – Guangzhou
2010 (1) China Tour  – PGA Championship

Other wins (5)
1995 (2) Volvo Masters of Malaysia, Volvo Masters of Thailand
1996 (2) Volvo Masters of Malaysia, Volvo Masters of Thailand
1998 (1) Hong Kong PGA Championship

European Senior Tour wins (1)

Results in major championships

CUT = missed the halfway cut
Note: Zhang only played in the Masters Tournament.

Results in World Golf Championships

"T" = Tied
Note that the HSBC Champions did not become a WGC event until 2009.

Team appearances
World Cup (representing China): 1995, 1996, 2001, 2007, 2008, 2009
Alfred Dunhill Cup (representing China): 1998, 1999, 2000
Dynasty Cup (representing Asia): 2003 (winners), 2005 (winners)
Royal Trophy (representing Asia): 2006

See also
List of golfers with most Asian Tour wins

References

External links

Chinese male golfers
Asian Tour golfers
European Tour golfers
Japan Golf Tour golfers
European Senior Tour golfers
Asian Games medalists in golf
Asian Games silver medalists for China
Golfers at the 1994 Asian Games
Medalists at the 1994 Asian Games
Sportspeople from Guangdong
People from Zhuhai
1965 births
Living people
20th-century Chinese people
21st-century Chinese people